Gygax may refer to:

 Daniel Gygax (born 1981), Swiss football midfielder
 Gary Gygax (1938–2008), American writer and game designer
 Jean-Louis Gygax (born 1935), Swiss former footballer
 Markus Gygax (born 1950), former commander of the Swiss Air Force
 Nicolas Gygax (born 1996), Swiss freestyle skier
 Samuel Gygax (born 2013), Swiss-English-Bulgarian footballer

Surnames of Swiss origin